Daniel de Sousa Britto (born 6 May 1994) is a Brazilian professional footballer who plays as a goalkeeper for Major League Soccer club San Jose Earthquakes.

Club career
Born in Barra do Garças, Daniel started his youth career with the academy of União Rondonópolis. In 2011, he moved to the under-17 squad of Internacional and progressed through the under-20 and under-23 teams in the following years.
 
On 9 May 2017, he was called up to the senior team for a Série B match against Londrina following the injuries of Danilo Fernandes, Marcelo Lomba and Keiller. Four days later, he made his debut in a 3–0 victory against Londrina. He also featured in a 1–0 defeat against Palmeiras in Copa do Brasil during the season.

On 15 June 2018, Daniel's contract was extended until 2021.

On 22 January 2023, Daniel was announced on San Jose Earthquakes for a two-year contract.

Career statistics

References

External links

1994 births
Living people
Association football goalkeepers
Brazilian expatriate footballers
Brazilian expatriate sportspeople in the United States
Brazilian footballers
Campeonato Brasileiro Série A players
Campeonato Brasileiro Série B players
Expatriate soccer players in the United States
San Jose Earthquakes players
Sport Club Internacional players
Sportspeople from Mato Grosso
União Esporte Clube players